The Place Jean-Jaurès, a.k.a. La Plaine, is a historic square in Marseille, Bouches-du-Rhône, Provence-Alpes-Côte d'Azur, France. As early as the 13th century, it was a camping ground for Christian Crusaders on their way to the Holy Land. It later became a meeting place to welcome dignitaries and members of the French royal family. It is now home to a farmers' market. It is named after politician Jean Jaurès.

Location

It is located at the intersection of the 1st, 5th, 6th arrondissements. From East to West, it can be reached via the Rue Curiol; Rue de la Bibliothèque; Rue des trois Mages; Rue Sibié; Rue Saint-Savournin; Rue Horace Bertin; Boulevard Chave; Rue de l'Olivier; Rue Ferrari; Rue Saint-Pierre; Rue Ferdinand Rey; Rue Saint-Michel; and Rue André Poggioli.

History
The square was established as a camping ground for Christian Crusaders on their way to the Holy Land in the 13th century.

It became a meeting place to welcome dignitaries and members of the French royal family. On May 22, 1319, Robert, King of Naples and his wife, Sancha of Majorca, were welcome here on their way to see the relics of Robert's brother, Louis of Toulouse. Shortly after the Battle of Marignano in 1515, King Francis I of France and his wife, Queen Claude of France were welcome here by Bishop Claude de Seyssel and viguier Louis de Vento. On November 6, 1564, King Charles IX of France, his mother Queen Catherine de' Medici, and his brother, the future King Henry III of France, were welcome here. On November 7, 1662, King Louis XIII of France was welcomed here by Consul Boniface de Cabannes.

On October 5, 1845, Saint Eugène de Mazenod, then the Bishop of Marseille, blessed a new church bell named "Marie Joséphine" here before installing it at the Notre-Dame de la Garde.

On November 14, 1886, Louis Capazza and Alphonse Fondère took off in a balloon from here and flew all the way to Corsica. As a result, a commemorative sculpture by Louis Botinelly on the corner of rue Sibié and Place Jean-Jaurès was dedicated on November 16, 1930, by aviators Dieudonné Costes and Maurice Bellonte.

In 1889, Nicolas Chave, the son of landowner and developer André Chave, commissioned architect Gaudensi Allar to design a house on the corner of the Boulevard Chave and the square.

The square was described by French author Jean Giono in his 1947 novelist Noé.

In 2016, a competition was realized to renovate the Place, which was met with stark opposition by the local residents when implementation started in 2018, seeing riots and confrontations with police and security forces. The lack of participation and consultation as well as the concomitance of the building collapse Rue d'Aubagne exacerbated the conflict.  

It was, before the renovation, home to a daily farmers' market except for Sundays, from 7:30Am to 1:30PM. On Tuesdays, Thursdays and Saturdays, the market is mostly set up for fresh vegetables and fruits. On Wednesdays, only flowers are sold. It was one of the largest farmers' markets in Marseille.

References

Buildings and structures in Marseille
Farmers' markets in France
Jean Jaurès